You're a Woman, I'm a Machine is the debut studio album by Canadian rock duo Death from Above 1979. It was released October 26, 2004, through Last Gang Records. The album was produced by Al-P who would later work alongside Jesse F. Keeler in the electronic music duo MSTRKRFT.

History
You're a Woman, I'm a Machine was recorded from February to April 2004 at The Chemical Sound in Toronto. Additional recording was done at Studio Plateau in Montreal and the album was engineered and produced by Al-P, with the exception of the Montreal sessions which were engineered by Drew Malamud.

All songs were written and recorded by Sebastien Grainger (drums and vocals) and Jesse F. Keeler (bass and synthesizer). The album was mastered by Joao Carvalho in his studio. All songs were published by Casino Steel Publishing Inc. and Iggy Softrock Publishing Inc. "Romantic Rights", "Blood on Our Hands" and "Black History Month" have been released as singles and remixed. "Little Girl", along with "Sexy Results", have also been remixed, and appear on their remix/b-side release, Romance Bloody Romance.

Vocalist and drummer Sebastien Grainger gave the song "Black History Month" its title simply because it was written in February. According to a post made by bassist Jesse F. Keeler on the band's forum, the song title "Sexy Results" is taken from The Simpsons. The episode "Pygmoelian" from the television series features the running line "...with sexy results".

The album's name is a play on a quote in the mini-series pilot of the 2004 reboot of Battlestar Galactica where Caprica Six tells Gaius Baltar "I'm a woman," to which he responds "You're a machine".

The liner notes dedicate the album to "Zoé", Grainger's niece. She is also the subject of the song "Little Girl" off the album.

Reception

The album has sold 175,000 copies worldwide according to the Toronto Star and gone gold (50,000 sold) in the band's native Canada.

Track listing

Personnel
Death from Above 1979
Jesse F. Keeler – bass, synthesizer, songwriting, recording, backing vocals on "Pull Out," "You're a Woman, I'm a Machine," design, layout
Sebastien Grainger – drums, vocals, songwriting, recording

Additional personnel
Alex Puodziukas – production, engineering
Drew Malamud – engineering
Joao Carvalho – mastering
Eva Michon – photography

References

External links

2004 debut albums
Death from Above 1979 albums
Vice Records albums
Last Gang Records albums
Victor Entertainment albums